Giuseppe Notarbartolo di Sciara (born November 27, 1948) is an Italian marine conservation ecologist who has bridged the worlds of marine science, conservation and policy.

Education and early career
Giuseppe Notarbartolo di Sciara's interest in marine life grew out of a lifelong love of the sea. His ancestors were mariners and his father was a founder of the Centro Velico Caprera, which honed Giuseppe's interest in Italy's marine environs and focused his childhood fascination with animals towards protecting marine life.

Notarbartolo di Sciara was born in 1948 in Venice and belongs to the ancient Sicilian family Notarbartolo. He obtained laurea degrees in biological sciences (1974) and in natural sciences (1976) at the University of Parma, Italy.  Opportunities for research on marine mammals in Italy were non-existent in the 1970s, however, so when he finished his studies at University of Parma, working on gobies and diving rats, he traveled to the U.S. where he resided until the 1985.  At Hubbs-Sea World Research Institute in San Diego, California, he worked on beluga whales and whale sharks, as well as doing research with humpback whales in Hawaii and Bryde's whales in Venezuela.  He later enrolled as a student at the Scripps Institution of Oceanography, University of California, San Diego, where he obtained a Ph.D. (1985) in marine biology with a thesis on manta ray taxonomy and ecology in the Gulf of California. There he discovered and described a new manta ray species, Mobula munkiana, which he named after his mentor, the esteemed oceanographer Walter Munk.  In 1985 Notarbartolo di Sciara moved back to his home country where he started working on Mediterranean and Red Sea conservations issues. In Italy he married Flavia Pizzi. They have two children, Marco and Bianca.

Research
Notarbartolo di Sciara has been concerned for over 40 years with the advancement of knowledge of the natural history, ecology, behaviour, taxonomy and conservation of aquatic vertebrates, with an emphasis on whales, dolphins, seals, sharks and manta rays, and has described his research in about 230 scientific works and books, and many reports and conference presentations.  While investigating manta ray taxonomy and ecology in the Gulf of California (Mexico), the research vessel on which he was living and navigating caught fire and sunk, however he continued his work after basing himself on land.  Back in Milano, Italy, Notarbartolo di Sciara continued influencing marine research through his involvement with the Tethys Research Institute, a private non-profit organisation specialising in the study and conservation of Mediterranean large marine vertebrates. Under his guidance the Tethys Research Institute was steered towards a suite of research activities to provide knowledge on Mediterranean marine mammals ecology essential for the implementation of conservation measures.

Conservation policy, science and management
In 1986 Notarbartolo di Sciara recognised the need for an institution targeting Mediterranean marine species at risk, and founded in response the Tethys Research Institute, specialising in the study and conservation of Mediterranean marine mammals. Today Tethys is a widely respected research NGO, producing numerous scientific publications each year and supporting the work of many dozens of graduate students in marine biology.

A decade later, Notarbartolo di Sciara was nominated by the President of Italy to lead the Central Institute for Applied Marine Research (ICRAM, later merged into ISPRA). His 7-year term as President of ICRAM guided that institution in a more strategic direction and allowed the creation and flourishing of many important conservation and planning initiatives, including the strengthening of marine protected area design, coordinated research within MPA sites, and applied science for conservation problem-solving. Notarbartolo di Sciara has also exhibited conservation leadership by serving as the President of the European Cetacean Society (1993-1997).

Today Notarbartolo di Sciara is well known throughout Europe as a conservation leader and television personality. He was a regular guest of "L’Arca di Noè", a series on wildlife of the world, and of Geo & Geo, a live show televised daily throughout Italy.

Marine Protected Areas (MPAs)
While at Tethys, Notarbartolo di Sciara proposed in 1991 the creation of a large protected area for cetaceans in the north-western Mediterranean, which later became the Pelagos Sanctuary for Mediterranean Marine Mammals, established by treaty between France, Italy and Monaco. His return to Italy from the U.S. allowed fateful encounters with many of the other champions for marine conservation who would become so instrumental in making the international Pelagos Sanctuary a reality, including Prince Ranier III of Monaco. Key was his membership in and subsequent coordination role in the marine mammal working group of CIESM (the International Commission for the Scientific Exploration of the Mediterranean Sea). Also critically important was his leadership and support of Tethys, since the Mediterranean cetaceans that are the focus of the NGO also provided the impetus for the establishment of the Pelagos Sanctuary. His involvement with Pelagos Sanctuary continues to this day.

As president of ICRAM he spearheaded the promotion of Italy's marine protected area system, based on solid science and monitoring practice. In particular, his efforts were instrumental in the launching of project "Afrodite", whereby the core zones of 15 Italian MPAs were monitored on the basis of standard protocols (e.g.,). Notarbartolo di Sciara has also often worked as a consultant to organisations involved in the conservation and management of the Mediterranean, including the Regional Activity Centre for Specially Protected Areas (RAC/SPA) of UNEP's Mediterranean Action Plan, and MedPAN.

Notarbartolo di Sciara has also been heavily involved with the conservation of the Red Sea. In particular, he has been a science advisor to HEPCA, the Hurghada Environmental Protection and Conservation Association – the main marine conservation NGO in Egypt. He was also instrumental in creating the highly touted management plan for Samadai MPA, which allowed tourism to co-exist with conservation of spinner dolphins and coral reefs. In 2017 with several colleagues he published a detailed review of cetaceans found in the Red Sea.

In 2013, with Erich Hoyt, he founded the IUCN Joint SSC/WCPA Task Force on Marine Mammal Protected Areas. The Task Force launched in 2016 a programme to identify Important Marine Mammal Areas (IMMAs) in the world's oceans, seas and inland waters, to support marine mammal and biodiversity conservation.

Protected species
While the president of ICRAM, Notarbartolo di Sciara served for several years as Commissioner for Italy at the International Whaling Commission, and contributed to the establishment of a national policy on whaling issues and on the promotion of a conservation agenda within the IWC, in cooperation with other like-minded nations.

In 2002 the Agreement on the Conservation of Cetaceans of the Black Sea, Mediterranean Sea and Contiguous Atlantic Area ACCOBAMS came into force, and Notarbartolo di Sciara served as the chair of the Agreement's Scientific Committee from the beginning until 2010. Notarbartolo di Sciara has served as Deputy Chair of the Cetacean Specialist Group of the International Union for the Conservation of Nature (IUCN) since 1991, and as member of the Shark Specialist Group since 1993.  Notarbartolo di Sciara has been engaged in monk seal conservation science since 1986, first conducting a feasibility study for a monk seal captive-breeding a rehabilitation facility in Italy on behalf of the Ministry of Agriculture and Forestry. In 2009 he was contracted by the Hellenic Society for the Study and Protection of the Mediterranean Monk Seal (MOm)  to draft the national conservation strategy for monk seals in Greece, and has drafted two successive editions (in 2014 and 2019) of the Regional Strategy for the Conservation of Monk Seals in the Mediterranean, both adopted by the Parties to the Barcelona Convention.

Notarbartolo di Sciara serves today in the Scientific Council of the Convention on the Conservation of Migratory Species of Wild Animals as the Councillor for aquatic mammals. He was appointed in such capacity in 2014 by the Conference of the Parties.

Teaching
From 2007 to 2016 Notarbartolo di Sciara taught a course on the science and policy of conserving marine biodiversity at the Università degli Studi di Milano, Italy.  From 1985 to 1990 he held the position of contract professor at the University of Parma, teaching courses in "Natural history of large marine vertebrates", "Behavioural ecology of cetaceans", and "Ethology of large marine vertebrates". He has been guest lecturer at the Scripps Institution of Oceanography and Yale University in the U.S., and at many other academic institutions in Europe and Latin America.

Views
On marine conservation: good science is essential to conserve the oceans; however conservation is a political endeavour. Without political will, conservation doesn't happen. Bridging science and policy is difficult but doable, and occasionally done; bridging policy and implementation is the real problem, because it is still the exception rather than the rule. Conservation policy is a vital link between science and politics, and maintaining a healthy relationship between scientific objectivity and political advocacy without damaging conservation science’s credibility is becoming an accepted practice. Through the science-mediated interpretation of empirical observations made in marine habitats, many scientists feel that they are entrusted with this information. It therefore becomes an imperative that carries a moral obligation to do everything possible to ensure that marine spaces are not only identified and studied, but respected and preserved.

On the position of humans in the natural world: until about 400,000 years ago, Homo sapiens was just one of the many mammals eking a living in the African savannah, busy finding something to eat while trying to avoid being eaten. In a relatively short time, and in ways now reasonably well understood by anthropologists, we have become technologically savvy to the point that we are now capable of dominating, and likely destroying, the whole planet. Unfortunately humans have been unable to develop, in parallel to their technological prowess, the moral stature necessary to control their brutal strength. This has made of them, essentially, a race of brutes. Having grown increasingly disconnected from nature generation after generation, humans have lost the sense of where they really belong, and most people today think of nature as an optional, to be kept outside of their cosy existence. Sheltered inside the protective cocoon of an imaginary reality, humans see nature mostly as something of a nuisance to be protected against.

Alas, the physical world in which we live is still the master, whether we like it or not, so this attitude of natural denial is likely to bring about mankind’s demise. Furthermore, it is also the cause of the most pernicious indifference and lack of interest for the natural world, and most damningly, of indifference for the damage we increasingly inflict on such world. The ethical consequences of this dystopian approach are staggering. Take for instance human attitude towards non-human animals. The very concept of dualism of humans vs. animals is misleading, as there is no such dualism, and humans are nothing but animals. However, quite conveniently we have convinced ourselves that such dualism is real, so that in our mind we can divide the world between us and all the others. Only we, the humans, are created in the image of God, only we have a soul, only we have an immortal destiny, etc. Everything else is inferior, created by that same God to be at our disposal, and has no rights.
Even now that science is telling us what insightful people knew all along, that non-human animals have personalities just like us, are capable of feeling joy and despair, love and fear, can make plans and play politics – in a word, are persons in no way different from human persons – the dualism persists unabated, as if it were a hard-wired feature of our brains. No matter what, on the one side it is us, with full rights, and on the other it is them, nothing more than some sort of animated things.

Honours and awards
 Knighthood in the Order of Saint-Charles, received from H.S.H. the Prince Albert II of Monaco on 17 November 2009, for services rendered to the Principality in his quality of Chair of the Scientific Committee of the "Agreement on the Conservation of Cetaceans of the Black Sea, Mediterranean Sea and Contiguous Atlantic Area".
 Honorary citizenship of the town of Sciara, in Sicily, founded in 1670 by Filippo Notarbartolo (the grandfather of the great-grandfather of Giuseppe's great-grandfather), received from the Mayor of Sciara on 12 December 1999. For activities in the field of science, thereby contributing to spreading the name of Sciara around the world.
 European Cetacean Society Mandy McMath Conservation Award, Malta, March 2015.
 "Tridente d’oro" awarded by the International Academy of Underwater Sciences and Technologies on 11 September 1993, on the island of Ustica (Italy), for activities in the field of marine science.
 International prize "Primula d’Oro" awarded by "Uomo e Natura, trimestrale delle aree protette mediterranee", on 28 September 2002, in Naples, for the spearheading of the creation of the Pelagos Sanctuary.
 Career prize "Una vita per il mare" ("A life for the sea"), 10th edition, awarded in 2006 by the City Aquarium of Milano and Verdeacqua.
 Echthrogaleus disciarai, a crustacean parasite of manta rays, named in Notarbartolo di Sciara's honour in 1987 (Benz G.W., Deets G.B. 1987. Echthrogaleus disciarai sp. nov. (Siphonostomatoidea: Pandaridae), a parasitic copepod of the devil ray Mobula lucasana Beebe and Tee Van, 1938 from the Sea of Cortez. Canadian Journal of Zoology 65:685-690).

References

External links 

 Giuseppe Notarbartolo di Sciara's personal website
 Tethys Research Institute
 ACCOBAMS
 Cetacean Specialist Group
 IUCN Marine Mammal Protected Areas Task Force
 Important Marine Mammal Areas

1948 births
20th-century Italian scientists
21st-century Italian scientists
Living people
Italian marine biologists